is a Japanese politician of the Democratic Party of Japan, a member of the House of Representatives in the Diet (national legislature). A native of Hiroshima, Hiroshima and graduate of the University of Tokyo, he worked at The Bank of Tokyo (now part of The Bank of Tokyo-Mitsubishi UFJ) from 1995 to 2000. He was elected to the House of Representatives for the first time in 2003. He was defeated in the 2005 election. He was reelected in 2009.

References

External links 
 Official website in Japanese.

1971 births
Living people
People from Hiroshima
University of Tokyo alumni
Members of the House of Representatives (Japan)
Democratic Party of Japan politicians
21st-century Japanese politicians